Afaha Efiat is a village in Etinan local government area of Akwa Ibom State, Nigeria.

References 

Geography of Nigeria